Morula mionigra is an extinct species of sea snail, a marine gastropod mollusk of the family Muricidae,  the murex snails or rock snails.

Distribution
This species occurs in Canaries.

References

mionigra
Gastropods described in 2018